Arthur Gordon Barry  (6 September 1885 – 21 August 1942) was a professional soldier and an English amateur golfer. He won the Amateur Championship in 1905.

Golf career
Barry was just 19 years old when he won the Amateur Championship in 1905, beating Osmund Scott, 3 and 2, in the final. At the time this made him the youngest player to win the title. He was studying at the University of St Andrews. He then studied at Cambridge University, playing against Oxford in 1906 and 1907. In 1914 he studied at Oxford and played for Oxford against Cambridge. He represented England against Scotland in the annual amateur international in 1906 and 1907. He was the army champion in 1922 and 1925.

Military career
An officer of the Royal Tank Regiment, Barry was, from 1935 to 1938, an instructor at the Staff College, Camberley. He was then specially employed from September−December 1938, and again from January−April 1939 before briefly becoming an Assistant Adjutant and Quartermaster-General (AA&QMG) and then a temporary AA&QMG. By October 1941 he was serving in Scottish Command as a Deputy Adjutant and Quartermaster-General. He died suddenly on 21 August 1942.

Amateur wins
1905 Amateur Championship
1922 Army Championship
1925 Army Championship

Major championships

Wins (1)

Team appearances
England–Scotland Amateur Match (representing England): 1906, 1907

References

External links
Generals of World War II

English male golfers
Amateur golfers
People from Torpoint
Commanders of the Order of the British Empire
Companions of the Distinguished Service Order
Recipients of the Military Cross
Royal Tank Regiment officers
British Army personnel killed in World War II
Military personnel from Cornwall
British Army brigadiers of World War II
Academics of the Staff College, Camberley
1885 births
1942 deaths